"Last Christmas" is an episode of the British science fiction television series Doctor Who that was first broadcast on 25 December 2014. It is the tenth Christmas special since the show’s revival in 2005. It was written by Steven Moffat and directed by Paul Wilmshurst.

In the special, alien time traveller the Doctor (Peter Capaldi) is reunited with his companion Clara Oswald (Jenna Coleman) as they must save a North Pole science base from creatures called dream crabs that induce dream states whilst killing their victims, with the help of Santa Claus (Nick Frost).

"Last Christmas" was viewed by 8.28 million in the United Kingdom and received positive reviews from critics, praising its story, acting and film influences.

Plot

On Christmas Eve, Clara finds Santa Claus stranded on her roof. The Doctor arrives to take Clara away. Santa tells the Doctor that he will need his help before the night is over. The Doctor and Clara arrive at a North Pole base where four of the crew in the infirmary are being devoured by Dream Crabs – blind aliens which induce dreams on their intended victims as a distraction whilst devouring the victims' brains and which use telepathy to see the surroundings of people thinking about a crab. More crabs attack the Doctor, Clara, and the unaffected crew, only for Santa to rescue them. Clara reveals that during their last meeting, she lied to the Doctor about Clara's boyfriend Danny Pink coming back from the dead. The Doctor says that he lied about finding Gallifrey. The Doctor sends Clara to recover Santa's crab specimen, but Clara, thinking about the crab, makes it come alive and attack her.

Clara reunites with Danny in a dream. The Doctor willingly falls victim to another crab to enter the dream. Clara still resists willing herself to wake up, until Danny tells her that she can miss him while also moving on with her life. Clara and the Doctor wake up, which kills the crabs devouring them. The Doctor deduces that they are not awake, but in a different layer of a multi-faceted dream and have been since the initial crab attack. He explains that Santa is the manifestation of their subconscious minds fighting back. Santa wakes the group up.

Clara reminds the Doctor that they met Santa before arriving, proving that everything else has also been a dream and that none of the scientists are scientists. The affected personnel – manifestations of the Doctor, Clara, and the "scientists'" minds – attack and kill Professor Albert. The Doctor, Clara, and the "scientists" dream of Santa, who wakes them up to their real lives, one by one, until only Clara is left.

Upon waking, the Doctor traces the psychic signal linking their dreams back to Clara. He pulls the crab off, and learns that Clara is now an elderly woman. The Doctor regrets not coming back sooner, when Santa appears. Realising that he is still dreaming, the Doctor wakes up again. He frees Clara, still a young adult, from the crab. Offering her all of time and space, the Doctor implores Clara to join him. Clara accepts.

Continuity 
When the Doctor visits the elderly Clara, he helps her open a Christmas cracker, returning the favour she did for the Eleventh Doctor in "The Time of the Doctor" (2013) when he was too weak to pull a cracker open by himself.

Production

Casting
In September 2014 announcements were made for a number of the guest cast, including Michael Troughton, Nick Frost, Nathan McMullen, Natalie Gumede and Faye Marsay. Michael Troughton is the younger son of Patrick Troughton, who played the Second Doctor from 1966 to 1969, and the younger brother of David Troughton, who appeared in The War Games, The Curse of Peladon, and "Midnight".

There were numerous rumours circulating that the special would be Jenna Coleman's last on the show. Coleman and lead writer Steven Moffat remained quiet on the issue and insisted that people watch the episode to see whether she would be continuing into the ninth series. During the episode's climax, Clara decides to continue travelling with the Doctor, and Moffat revealed following the episode's airing that Coleman would appear in all of the ninth series. According to Moffat, Coleman was "to-ing and fro-ing" over her future in the series before ultimately deciding to continue. In a 2018 interview, Moffat confirmed that the script for "Last Christmas" originally contained Clara's exit from the series; Coleman reversed her decision to leave following the first read-through, and the episode's ending was subsequently re-written to allow the character to continue.

Marsay's character of Shona was considered by Moffat to be Coleman's replacement as the companion for the ninth series, though nothing was fully formed. With Coleman electing to stay on the show, this would mark Marsay's only appearance. Elements of Shona were later reworked into the character of Bill Potts, who was the show's companion when Coleman left after series nine.

Filming
Filming on "Last Christmas" was scheduled to start two weeks after the Series 8 World Tour Promotion. Paul Wilmshurst directed the episode.  The read-through for the episode took place on 3 September 2014, and filming began on 8 September in Cardiff, with Wilmshurst tweeting that it would likely take four weeks to complete. Scenes were filmed at Vaendre Hall in the Cardiff suburb of St Mellons.

Promotion
A preview was shown during Children in Need which featured The Doctor, Clara, Nick Frost as Santa Claus, and Dan Starkey (who also plays Strax of the Paternoster Gang) and Nathan McMullen as elves.  On 11 December 2014, the BBC released a 30-second trailer for the episode on YouTube.

Broadcast and reception
The episode was watched by 8.28 million viewers, the lowest Christmas Day rating since the show's return in 2005, and was the sixth most watched programme on BBC One for Christmas Day 2014. The early figures for overnight viewing estimated that the episode was watched by 6.34 million viewers, making it the eighth most watched event on television for Christmas Day 2014. However, it received a total of 2.62 million viewers on BBC America, beating the previous record established by "The Time of the Doctor", and became the most watched episode of the revived series in the channel's history. It also got 1.07 million requests on BBC iPlayer. The episode received an Audience Appreciation Index of 82.

Critical reception

"Last Christmas" received critical acclaim, with many praising the fun, scary nature of the episode and noting the influences of Inception and Alien. It holds an approval rating of 92%, based on 12 reviews, and an average score of 8.76/10 on Rotten Tomatoes.

The A.V. Club awarded the episode the highest grade of the site, an "A". Alasdair Wilkins praised Steven Moffat’s script as "inordinately clever" in using the trappings of a "fluffy, silly Christmas special" to make the story scary. He also praised Capaldi's performance in the special for depicting the unabashed joy common in the Tenth and Eleventh Doctor eras but was "never really" seen in series 8. Morgan Jeffery of Digital Spy awarded the episode a 4 out of 5, stating that the episode was an "absolute cracker" that refused to be "throwaway" or "light on substance". He believed the influences of Alien and Inception on the script provided viewers with "both food for thought and fuel for our nightmares".

Michael Hogan of The Daily Telegraph awarded the episode a 4 out of 5, calling it "marvellously merry" and stating that it "had heart as well as head, so ended like a festive special should: happily, with a cockle-warming cosy glow". Chris Pyke of the Daily Mirror also praised the "Doctor Who spin" the various film references had. He also expressed praise over Clara's continuation, saying it was "the icing on the cake".

Radio Times awarded the episode a 3 out of 4. Patrick Mulkern was "peculiarly touched by Clara’s sentiment, "Every Christmas is last Christmas" and her admission that the Time Lord is her very own Father Christmas". IGN awarded the episode an 8.8 out of 10, deemed "Excellent". Matt Risley labelled the episode "An entertaining and satisfying slice of Who that combines festive face-huggers with a Christmas miracle". He criticised the ageing Clara make up along with many other reviewers. He praised the episode as being both Doctor Whos most "festive and least yuletide-y" Christmas special. Simon Brew of Den of Geek heavily praised the episode for its writing, acting, direction and music, and considered it an improvement over the previous Christmas special "The Time of the Doctor". He felt that "Last Christmas" capped off what he felt was "one of Doctor Whos strongest years in recent times".

Home media
"Last Christmas" was released on DVD and Blu-ray in the United Kingdom on 26 January 2015, in Australia on 28 January 2015, and in the United States on 17 February 2015.

The ten Christmas specials between "The Christmas Invasion" and "Last Christmas" inclusive were released in a boxset titled Doctor Who – The  Christmas Specials on 19 October 2015.

Soundtrack

Selected pieces of score from "Last Christmas", as composed by Murray Gold, were released on 18 May 2015 by Silva Screen Records as the third disc of the soundtrack covering series 8.

Notes

References

External links

Twelfth Doctor episodes
2014 British television episodes
Television episodes written by Steven Moffat
Doctor Who Christmas specials
Doctor Who stories set on Earth
Santa Claus in television
Television episodes about dreams